Joe Balyeat (October 26, 1956 – October 4, 2022) was a former member of the Montana Legislature.  Balyeat was elected as a Republican to Senate District 34, representing Bozeman, Montana, in 2004. Previously, Balyeat served two terms in the Montana House.

Balyeat resigned his Senate Seat in June 2012 to take on the Montana State Director role with Americans for Prosperity.  He would have been ineligible to run for re-election due to Montana's term limits.

Balyeat was found dead from natural causes in Truman Gulch on October 5, 2022. Balyeat had been hunting and did not return when expected.

References

Living people
1956 births
Republican Party Montana state senators
Politicians from Great Falls, Montana
Republican Party members of the Montana House of Representatives